The 2018 Tour of Oman was a road cycling stage race that took place between 13 and 18 February 2018 in Oman. It was the ninth edition of the Tour of Oman and was rated as a 2.HC race as part of the 2018 UCI Asia Tour. The previous year's winner, Ben Hermans, did not defend his title.

Teams
Eighteen teams were invited to take part in the race. These included nine UCI WorldTeams and nine UCI Professional Continental teams.

Route

Final general classification

Classification leadership table
There were five principal classifications in the 2018 Tour of Oman.

The first and most important was the general classification; the winner of this was considered the overall winner of the race. It was calculated by adding together each rider's times on each stage, then applying bonuses. Bonuses were awarded for coming in the top three on a stage (10 seconds for the winner, 6 seconds for the second placed rider and 4 seconds for the rider in third) or at intermediate sprints (3 seconds, 2 seconds and 1 second for the top three riders). The rider in the lead of the general classification wore a red jersey.

The second competition was the points classification, calculated by awarding points for the top 10 riders at the finish of each stage (15 points to the winner down to 1 point for the rider in tenth place) and to the top three at intermediate sprints (3 points, 2 points and 1 point). The rider with the highest points total was the leader of the classification and wore a green jersey. The young rider classification was open to those born on or after 1 January 1992. The young rider ranked highest in the general classification was the leader of the young rider classification and wore a white jersey.

The combativity classification was based on points won at intermediate sprints and classified climbs along the route. Points were awarded to the top three riders across each sprint or climb (3 points, 2 points and 1 point). The rider with the most accumulated points was the leader of the classification and wore a white jersey with red and green polka dots. The final competition was the team classification. On each stage, each team was awarded a time based on the cumulative time of its top three riders; the times for each stage were then added together and the team with the lowest total time was the leader of the team classification.

References

External links
 

2018
2018 in Omani sport
2018 UCI Asia Tour